West Layton is a village and civil parish in the Richmondshire district of North Yorkshire, England, close to the border with County Durham and a few miles west of Darlington.

History
The village is mentioned in the Domesday Book as belonging to Count Alan, and as having 16 villagers, a  meadow, one fishery and two churches. Formerly in the wapentake of Gilling West and the parish of Hutton Magna, the village is now in Richmondshire in North Yorkshire. The name of Layton is historically recorded as Laston, Lastun and Latton, and means the town where the leeks are grown.

The population of the civil parish taken at the 2011 Census was less than 100. Details are included with the parish of East Layton. In 2015, North Yorkshire County Council estimated that the population of the village was 40.

References

External links

Villages in North Yorkshire
Civil parishes in North Yorkshire